Tumwater High School is a secondary school in Tumwater, Washington serving grades 912 in Thurston County.  It is one of two comprehensive high schools in the Tumwater School District.   Tumwater High School generally draws students from the portions of the Tumwater School District east of Interstate 5 and the Littlerock area west of I-5. Tumwater High School caters to its student population by having an extended parking lot, called "overflow", which allows for some ease whilst parking. During bus arrival, there are usual delays to the ability to park.

Athletics

Tumwater High School offers athletic teams in cross country, golf, football, soccer, dance, swim and dive, tennis, volleyball, basketball, bowling, wrestling, baseball, fastpitch, and track and field. Tumwater also offers a club rifle team, which currently holds two national championships.

The town has supported athletics at Tumwater High School and the recently formed Black Hills High School. The school's teams are known as the T-Birds, and  have experienced success at the league, district and state level for all of their teams since the school's founding.

Tumwater is best known for its football program. Most of the success can be credited to long time head football coach Sid Otton, who coached from 1973–2016. In the 2005 season Otton broke the all-time Washington state wins record of 273 wins. During Otton's tenure, Tumwater won five state titles, was nationally ranked four times, and made the state playoffs more than 23 times.  The final state title won under Coach Otton was on December 4, 2010 against Archbishop Murphy High School in the 2A State Football Championship, with a score of 3414. Otton compiled a career record of 394–131 in 49 seasons and retired following the 2016 season after 43 years at Tumwater. He retired as the all-time winningest high school football coach in Washington State history. He was elected to the Washington State Football Coaches Association Hall of Fame in 1996
For the 2017 season, former Otton player Bill Beattie ('78) took over as head coach and has continued the "Tumwater Winning Football" tradition. The T-birds won their 6th State football title with a 48–34 win over Steilacoom High School on December 7, 2019.

Tumwater has also experienced success on the basketball court with both the boys' (third year straight, a school record) and girls' basketball (second straight year) teams making state together in back-to-back years for the first time in school history.

The Tumwater volleyball program has also had a lot of success over the years, including winning the state championship in 2008, 2012, 2014, and 2016. Many of the former Tumwater Volleyball players have gone on to play at the collegiate level. They are attending colleges such as Gonzaga University, Northwest University, Eastern Oregon University, Western Oregon University, and many other schools.

Baseball has also become a perineal contended since 2013, earning the schools first State Championship in 2022.

Tumwater High School is a 2A-division member of the Washington Interscholastic Activities Association.

State championships, 2nd place:

 Girls' basketball - 2007, 2010
 Girls' cross country - 1984
 Fastpitch softball - 1992
 Boys' golf - 1997, 1998
 Boys' tennis - 1986
 Boys' track and field - 1992
 Girls' volleyball - 2007, 2011, 2015
 Baseball - 2013

Tumwater Acting Company
The Theatre program at THS has an outstanding history, including many national and state titles for their multitude of talented students. Past TAC Directors include Amy Ullen, Kristina Cummins, Joann Boswell, Robin Tuckett, and Heidi Fredericks. The current TAC Director is Harrison Fry.

Past Shows Include:

20062007:
Romeo and Juliet, 
Murder's In The Heir

20072008:
The Miracle Worker,
Ask Any Girl,
Little Shop of Horrors

20082009:
The 11 Variations of Friar John,
The Crucible,
Anything Goes

20092010:
Trouble at the Talent Show,
Anatomy of Gray,
Much Ado About Nothing,
Once On This Island

20102011:
Little Women,
The Ugly Duckling,
The Brother's Grimm,
The Music Man

20112012:
Our Town,
A Midsummer Night's Dream,
The Pirates of Penzance

20122013:
Harvey, A winter showcase of 6 one-act plays, 
Aida

20132014:
How to Succeed in Business Without Really Trying,
Julius Caesar

20142015:
The Voice of the Prairie,
The 25th Annual Putnam County Spelling Bee,
The Tempest

20152016:
Macbeth,
Arsenic and Old Lace,
Oliver!

20162017:
Twelfth Night,
Little Shop of Horrors,
The Mousetrap

20172018:
Frankenstein,
Guys And Dolls,
The Wind in the Willows

20182019:
A Midsummer Night's Dream,
Check Please,
Once Upon a Mattress

Sources

Notable alumni

Cade Otton, NFL Tight End for the Tampa Bay Buccaneers.

Ryan Otton, NCAA Tight End for the Washington Huskies.

External links
 Tumwater High School website

High schools in Thurston County, Washington
Public high schools in Washington (state)
Educational institutions established in 1961
Tumwater, Washington
1961 establishments in Washington (state)